Sørporten (Southern Gate) is the southern part of Hinlopen Strait, Svalbard. It extends between the Bastian Islands and Bråsvellbreen at Nordaustlandet.

References

Straits of Svalbard